The 27 municipalities of the region of Southwest Finland in Finland are divided into five sub-regions.



Åboland–Turunmaa sub-region 
 Kimitoön (Kemiönsaari)
 Pargas (Parainen) (Väståboland/Länsi-Turunmaa between 2009-2011)

Loimaa sub-region 
 Aura
 Koski Tl (Koskis)
 Loimaa
 Marttila (S:t Mårtens)
 Oripää
 Pöytyä

Salo sub-region 
 Salo
 Somero

Turku sub-region 
 Kaarina (S:t Karins)
 Lieto (Lundo)
 Masku
 Mynämäki (Virmo)
 Naantali (Nådendal)
 Nousiainen (Nousis)
 Paimio (Pemar)
 Raisio (Reso)
 Rusko
 Sauvo (Sagu)
 Turku (Åbo)

Vakka-Suomi sub-region 
 Kustavi (Gustavs)
 Laitila (Letala)
 Pyhäranta
 Taivassalo (Tövsala)
 Uusikaupunki (Nystad)
 Vehmaa (Vemo)

Former municipalities 
Kuusisto (to Kaarina in 1946)
 Naantalin maalaiskunta (to Naantali in 1964)
 Angelniemi (to Halikko in 1967)
 Pargas landskommun (to Pargas in 1967)
 Uskela (to Salo in 1967)
 Maaria (to Turku in 1967)
 Kakskerta (to Turku in 1968)
 Hitis (to Dragsfjärd in 1969)
 Karuna (to Sauvo in 1969)
Uudenkaupungin maalaiskunta (to Uusikaupunki in 1969)
 Paattinen (to Turku in 1973)
 Pyhämaa (to Uusikaupunki in 1974)
 Metsämaa (to Loimaan kunta in 1976)
 Karjala (to Mynämäki in 1977)
 Somerniemi (to Somero in 1977)
 Lokalahti (to Uusikaupunki in 1981)
 Kalanti (to Uusikaupunki in 1993)
 Loimaan kunta (to Loimaa in 2005)
 Karinainen (to Pöytyä in 2005)
 Mietoinen (to Mynämäki in 2007)
 Piikkiö (to Kaarina in 2009)
 Dragsfjärd (formed Kimitoön with Kimito and Västanfjärd in 2009)
 Kimito (formed Kimitoön with Dragsfjärd and Västanfjärd in 2009)
 Västanfjärd (formed Kimitoön with Dragsfjärd and Kimito in 2009)
 Alastaro (to Loimaa in 2009)
 Mellilä (to Loimaa in 2009)
 Houtskär (formed Väståboland in 2009)
 Iniö (formed Väståboland in 2009)
 Korpo (formed Väståboland in 2009)
 Nagu (formed Väståboland in 2009)
 Pargas (formed Väståboland in 2009)
 Askainen (to Masku in 2009)
 Lemu (to Masku in 2009)
 Merimasku (to Naantali in 2009)
 Rymättylä (to Naantali in 2009)
 Velkua (to Naantali in 2009)
 Yläne (to Pöytyä in 2009)
 Vahto (to Rusko in 2009)
 Halikko (to Salo in 2009)
 Kiikala (to Salo in 2009)
 Kisko (to Salo in 2009)
 Kuusjoki (to Salo in 2009)
 Muurla (to Salo in 2009)
 Perniö (to Salo in 2009)
 Pertteli (to Salo in 2009)
 Suomusjärvi (to Salo in 2009)
 Särkisalo (to Salo in 2009)
 Tarvasjoki (to Lieto in 2015)

See also 
Western Finland Province
Regions of Western Finland

External links